Chicago Gay Crusader was a periodical about gay issues in Chicago and the United States. It was created in 1973 by Michael Bergeron and William B. Kelley, becoming defunct in 1976. The first issue in May 1973 marked Chicago's "first successful attempt at producing a serious gay newspaper", following another paper that only lasted two issues.

References

Book sources
 

1973 establishments in Illinois
Defunct newspapers published in Chicago
LGBT culture in Chicago
LGBT-related newspapers published in the United States
Publications established in 1973
Publications disestablished in 1976
1976 disestablishments in Illinois
1970s LGBT literature